Angelina Jany Teny is a South Sudanese politician who served as Minister of Defence since March 2020.

She was previously a state minister of Energy and Mining in the Khartoum-based Government of National Unity between 2005 and 2010. She ran for election as governor of Unity State in April 2010 but was defeated in an election that she claimed was rigged.

Background
Angelina Teny was born in 1953 in what is today Unity State, South Sudan. She was educated in Great Britain and speaks both English and Arabic fluently.
Angelina Teny is one of the most prominent women politicians in South Sudan.
In November 2003, Angelina Teny facilitated a conference of South Sudanese women on "The House of Nationalities" held in Lokichokio a concept designed to foster peace and national unity through recognition of diversity.

State Minister of Energy and Mining

The Second Sudanese Civil War formally ended in January 2005 with establishment of an autonomous Government of South Sudan (GOSS) and as a defined process to move towards a referendum on full independence.
Angelina Teny was a state minister of Energy and Mining in the Khartoum-based Government of National Unity between 2005 and 2010.
At the November 2006 conference on Oil and the Future of Sudan, held in Juba, she noted that there had been considerable controversy over the Ministry of Energy and Mining when the Government of National Unity was being formed.
The oil industry had been developed during the civil war as a means to finance that war at great human cost  and military concerns had dictated the structure of the industry.
Now the government was struggling to organize the National Petroleum Commission (NPC) but the SPLM had confidence in the process.

She said "Sudan now has the opportunity to develop the oil sector in order to support the peace to ensure that unity is attractive to ensure that those aggrieved during war get redressed and to take our place in the modern world where oil is produced with social responsibility. Now is the time as a nation to put together a vision and strategy for the proper management of this strategic resource". She noted that contracts had to be reviewed, local people compensated and environmental issues addressed.
The expansion of the oil production south into the vast Sudd wetlands protected under the international Ramsar Convention, raised significant challenges. In a 2007 interview she noted that oil production and sales figures were given to her ministry by the Chinese-led Greater Nile Production Company. The ministry had no way of checking for accuracy.
She said: "We have an oil revenue calculation committee and every month, we look at the production and sales figures, and work out the figures for who takes what, Right now, those figures are just based on production and then shared between North and South. There isn't much trust that's why you hear complaints from  South Sudan about the amounts they are getting. In October 2007 she said "GOSS [Government of Southern Sudan] is uncertain about the oil production figures released by the federal government and also feels that its quota is not fair. GOSS was not given any representation at the strategic stages of oil production and overseas marketing".

April 2010 elections

In the April 2010 elections Angelina Teny broke from her party, the Sudan People's Liberation Movement, and ran as an independent candidate for Governor of Unity State. Her main challenger was the incumbent governor Taban Deng Gai.
Early reports showed she was leading by a wide margin against the other six contestants.

The state electoral body announced that Taban Deng Gai won by 137,662 votes, beating Angelina Teny with 63,561 votes.
The defeated parties said in a joint statement that there had been wide spread rigging and called for a review by the National Elections Commission. Angelina Teny said she would not accept or recognize the results.
Angelina Teny detailed many irregularities, including ejection of observers, missing ballot boxes, vote counts in excess of the number of registered voters and so on.
Her campaign leader was arrested when he and members of his team tried to enter the State High Elections Committee's office.
Police shot dead two people and four others were injured when police opened fire on a crowd of protesters in the state capital, Bentiu.
Angelina Teny called on her supporters to be calm and avoid violence, which has been epidermic in Unity State, the main oil-producing area in South Sudan.

Later career
The Unity State governor Taban Deng later accused Teny and SPLM-DC Chairman Lam Akol of supporting Colonel Galwak Gai, who led a mutiny against the SPLM Army after the elections. Edward Lino, a member of the SPLM leadership, allegedly accused her of supporting insurgency in Unity State. In response, Angelina Teny said that she was filing a lawsuit against Edward Lino.
Teny was said to have promised to appoint Gai as a county commissioner if she won the election, and he rebelled when he failed to obtain this position.

Angelina Teny was appointed adviser on petroleum matters to the South Sudan Energy and Mines Ministry, and was the leader of negotiations with the Khartoum government over ownership and management of oil assets. 
While attending an energy conference in Ghana in September 2011 she spoke on the state of the oil industry in South Sudan after two months of full independence. 
She said that management of oil resources was largely though not entirely being handled from the Sudan, and South Sudan was in control of most of its oil fields.
Those fields that are producing had output of about 300,000 barrels per day.

Angelina Teny said the government had created the outline of a 3-year program to develop infrastructure. 
This included construction of an oil refinery to meet domestic needs. 
A new law to regulate the industry was almost ready to be published.
South Sudan urgently needed capital to meet Millennium Development Goals and to build roads and pipelines. 
She said the oil companies were talking to the government which was reviewing existing contracts.
More information was needed for Juba to be able to assess reserves.

Personal life
She is the wife to Riek Machar, the first Vice President of South Sudan.
They have four children. On 18 May 2020, Teny and her husband tested positive for COVID-19. after showing signs  and symptoms.

References

Living people
Nuer people
Sudan People's Liberation Movement politicians
21st-century South Sudanese women politicians
21st-century South Sudanese politicians
Government ministers of South Sudan
People from Unity (state)
Women government ministers of South Sudan
Year of birth missing (living people)
Female defence ministers